Jeh (also spelled Die, Gie, Yaeh) is a language spoken by more than fifteen thousand people in Vietnam.  There are also several thousand speakers in the Laotian provinces of Xekong and Attapu.

References

Languages of Vietnam
Bahnaric languages
Languages of Laos